Vincenzo Romano Michelotti (born November 13, 1996 in Borgo Maggiore, San Marino) is an alpine skier from San Marino. He will compete for San Marino at the 2014 Winter Olympics in the giant slalom competition. Michelotti was also selected to carry the Sammarinese flag during the opening ceremony.

Michelotti was also San Marino's only athlete at the 2012 Winter Youth Olympics.

Michelotti also plays football in San Marino Calcio youth system and competed at continental level with U-17 national team.

See also
San Marino at the 2014 Winter Olympics

References

1996 births
Living people
Olympic alpine skiers of San Marino
Alpine skiers at the 2014 Winter Olympics
Sammarinese male alpine skiers
Sammarinese footballers
Alpine skiers at the 2012 Winter Youth Olympics
Association footballers not categorized by position